Jane is a comic strip created and drawn by Norman Pett exclusively for the British tabloid newspaper The Daily Mirror from 5 December 1932 to 10 October 1959.

Creation 
Jane was born when artist Norman Pett made a wager that he could create a comic strip as popular to adults as the strip Pip, Squeak and Wilfred was to children. Originally Pett's wife Mary modelled for him, but in the late 1930s, she abandoned modelling in pursuit of golf. Pett then teamed up with Chrystabel Leighton-Porter whom he met while she was modelling for a class in Birmingham in 1939.

Characters and story
Originally entitled Jane's Journal, Or the Diary of a Bright Young Thing, the salacious comic strip featured the misadventures of the title ingenue. The heroine had a habit of frequently (and most often inadvertently) losing her clothes. Her intimate confidant was a pet dachshund named Fritz. Her full name was Jane Gay, a play on the name Lady Jane Grey.

The strip became very popular during the Second World War and was considered morale-boosting, inspiring a similar American version, Milton Caniff's comic strip Male Call. Until 1943, Jane rarely stripped beyond her undergarments, but then she made a fully nude appearance when getting out of a bath and clumsily falling into the middle of a crowd of British soldiers.

Norman Pett's assistant Michael Hubbard continued, beginning in 1948, to develop the cartoon's original storyline until ending in 1959 – with charmer Georgie giving Jane a happy marriage and ending the series. The Mirror tried to revive the character on several occasions. One such comic strip was Jane, Daughter of Jane, who was apparently the original's grown-up offspring, but she lacked her mother's charm and innocence. Another attempt was made during the 1980s.

Recurring characters
Jane Gay – heroine and 'Queen of the Undie-World'.
Fritz – Jane's faithful dachshund.
Georgie Porgie – Jane's boyfriend (later husband).
The Colonel – Jane's commanding officer and friend.
Lola Pagola – Jane's arch-enemy, also a Nazi spy.
Thelma – The Colonel's demanding and suspicious wife.
Dinah – Jane's good friend. Dinah works with NAAFI.

Jane visits America
During 1945, King Features Syndicate attempted to distribute Jane in the United States. However, the nudity was too much for prudish American audiences, and the attempt ceased during 1946.

Other comics in the tradition of, and possibly inspired by, Jane include Sally the Sleuth, Male Call and Little Annie Fanny.

Adaptations
The strip inspired an eponymous stage play during the 1940s, with Leighton-Porter playing the character of Jane (see Jane on Stage). Chrystabel also featured in a 1949 movie, The Adventures of Jane, directed by Edward G. Whiting.  A 1987 movie, Jane and the Lost City, starring Kirsten Hughes in the title role, was directed by Terry Marcel.

A television series was made by the BBC between 1982 and 1984, featuring Glynis Barber in the title role. The first season was titled simply Jane, while the second was titled Jane in the Desert. Despite the early evening scheduling slot, the show was decidedly risqué with Jane continuously stripping down to her underwear, including stockings and suspenders. At the end of the second series' closing episode she appeared topless momentarily. Despite considerable publicity in the press at the time of its original screening, the show became somewhat obscure and has never had a commercial video or DVD release. The show was briefly revived during 1985 as a three-part sequence shown over a single morning on Breakfast Television but without Glynis Barber in the main role.

Stage burlesque show

During and after World War II, Chrystabel Leighton-Porter performed a striptease act as the character of Jane. In the war, it was compulsory for actors and entertainers to join ENSA (Entertainments National Service Association) whose job it was to organize entertainment for the troops, and although Chrystabel's audience were mainly soldiers, she was never asked by ENSA to perform on the front line. Chrystabel explained:

The content of the act varied due to restrictions set in by local censors.

Collections
 .
 .
 .
 .
  .
 . Reprints 531 daily strips from October 1943 to June 1945.
 .

References

External links
 
 
 
 .
  with the editor of the 2009 "Misadventures of Jane" collection.
 "Jane and Pett": 1945 British Pathé newsreel of Norman Pett drawing Christabel Leighton Porter

Adult comic strips
BBC Television shows
British comic strips
Erotic comics
Adventure comics
Humor comics
1932 comics debuts
1959 comics endings
Comics characters introduced in 1932
British comics characters
Female characters in comics
Comics about women
Comics adapted into plays
British comics adapted into films
Comics adapted into television series
Daily Mirror